Carmenta mimosa is a moth of the family Sesiidae. It is native to Central America (Mexico, Honduras and Nicaragua), but has been introduced to the Northern Territory of Australia in 1989.

Adults look like wasps, but have a wider connection between the thorax and abdomen. They have transparent wings with broad black margins. Their body is black, with a pair of white stripes on the thorax and three transverse white bands on the abdomen.

The larvae feed on Mimosa pigra. They bore into the stems of their host plant, weakening the stem, which can cause it to break off and die.

Life cycle
Females can lay up to 300 eggs, which take about eleven days to hatch. Larvae feed for about sixty days, after which it pupates and emerges about eleven days later. The complete life cycle takes about nine weeks.

External links
Australian Faunal Directory
Australian Insects
Carmenta mimosa Factsheet
Classification of the Superfamily Sesioidea (Lepidoptera: Ditrysia)

Sesiidae
Moths of Australia
Moths of Central America
Moths described in 1984